Byron Knutson (born November 9, 1929, near Harlow, North Dakota) is a North Dakota Democratic-NPL Party politician who served as the North Dakota Insurance Commissioner from 1977 to 1980 and as the North Dakota Labor Commissioner from 1987 to 1990. He previously served in the North Dakota House of Representatives from 1959 to 1962.

Early life
Knutson was born near Harlow (a small town near Brinsmade) on November 29, 1929 and raised in Harlow near Devis Lake.

He was educated in Harlow elementary schools and graduated from Benson County Agriculture and Training High School in Maddock, North Dakota. He attended North Dakota State University, University of North Dakota, and Valley City State College for his college education.

Political career 
He served in the North Dakota House of Representatives from 1959 to 1963, and  ran for North Dakota Public Service Commissioner in 1974, but was unsuccessful. He was elected as the North Dakota Insurance Commissioner in 1976, but was defeated in 1980. After being defeated, he ran for North Dakota Labor Commissioner in 1982, and for North Dakota Secretary of State in 1984, but was unsuccessful in both elections. He tried again for Labor Commissioner in 1986, and this time won, defeating Orville W. Hagen. His tenure was short-lived, however, and he was defeated in 1990 by Craig Hagen, who is of no relation to Orville.

Opinions

Personal life 
He is married to Bernice, and has two daughters: Rebecca and Harmony.

Notes

Members of the North Dakota House of Representatives
North Dakota Labor Commissioners
Insurance Commissioners of North Dakota
1929 births
Living people